Aristos may refer to

 Refers to the Greek terminology for "nobility", and is the root term for aristocrat
 This also refers to the Greek term for "superior" "best", see Arete (excellence)
 Aristos, an online review of the arts; see Michelle Marder Kamhi
 Aristos (Saga of the Skolian Empire)
 The Aristos, a 1964 book by John Fowles
 Aristos Papandroulakis (born 1965), celebrity chef
 RKVV Aristos, a former Dutch amateur football club

See also